Zayandehrud District is in Saman County, Chaharmahal and Bakhtiari province, Iran. At the latest National Census in 2016, the district had 10,167 inhabitants living in 3,288 households.

References 

Saman County

Districts of Chaharmahal and Bakhtiari Province

Populated places in Chaharmahal and Bakhtiari Province

Populated places in Saman County

fa:بخش زاینده‌رود